John Hanmer, 1st Baron Hanmer (22 December 1809 – 8 March 1881), known as Sir John Hanmer, Bt, between 1828 and 1872, was a British politician.

Background and education
Hanmer was the son of Thomas Hanmer, eldest son of Sir Thomas Hanmer, 2nd Baronet. His mother was Arabella Charlotte, daughter of T. S. D. Bucknell. He was educated at Eton and Christ Church, Oxford. In 1828, he succeeded his grandfather as third Baronet.

Political career
Hanmer sat as Member of Parliament for Shrewsbury between 1832 and 1837, for Kingston upon Hull between 1841 and 1847 and for Flint Boroughs between 1847 and 1872. 
He also served as High Sheriff of Flintshire for 1832. In 1872 he was raised to the peerage as Baron Hanmer, of Hanmer, and of Flint, both in the County of Flint.

Family
Lord Hanmer married Georgiana Chetwynd, daughter of Sir George Chetwynd, 2nd Baronet, in 1833. There were no children from the marriage. Lady Hanmer died in March 1880. Lord Hanmer died in March 1881, aged 71. The barony became extinct on his death while he was succeeded in the baronetcy by his younger brother, Wyndham.

References

Attribution:

Works

External links 
 
 

1809 births
1881 deaths
Barons in the Peerage of the United Kingdom
Members of the Parliament of the United Kingdom for English constituencies
High Sheriffs of Flintshire
UK MPs 1832–1835
UK MPs 1835–1837
UK MPs 1841–1847
UK MPs 1847–1852
UK MPs 1852–1857
UK MPs 1857–1859
UK MPs 1859–1865
UK MPs 1865–1868
UK MPs 1868–1874
UK MPs who were granted peerages
People educated at Eton College
Alumni of Christ Church, Oxford
Peers of the United Kingdom created by Queen Victoria